= Inauguration of Donald Trump =

Inauguration of Donald Trump may refer to:

- First inauguration of Donald Trump, held in 2017 on his first of two presidencies
- Second inauguration of Donald Trump, held in 2025 on his second and last presidency

== See also ==
- The full text of Donald Trump's First Inaugural Address at Wikisource
- The full text of Donald Trump's Second Inaugural Address at Wikisource
